Helvetia is a ghost town in Pima County, Arizona, United States that was settled in 1891 and abandoned in the early 1920s. Helvetia is an ancient name for Switzerland.

History
Helvetia was founded in 1891 for the settlement of workers from the surrounding copper mines. At its peak the city had 300 inhabitants, of which most were Mexicans.  At one point, Helvetia had a public school (run by School District No. 14, Pima County). In 1911, the mines closed, due to low commodity prices. The post office, which had opened on December 12, 1899, closed on December 31, 1921, marking the end of the town.

The 1967 western film Hombre was shot in Helvetia.

Today
There is not much left of Helvetia to see, simply a pair of foundation walls rising above a floor, the ruins of the smelter, and the cemetery. In the vicinity there are slag heaps and shafts from the mines. Although the town is gone, there are several homes in the immediate area that are still in use, including the Helvetia Ranch.

Geography

The Rosemont project
The Rosemont project is a large porphyry copper deposit nearby, which may yet be developed into a mine pending proper approval. There is an extensive area of porphyry copper mineralization between Helvetia and the ghost town of Rosemont. Four centers of potentially economic copper mineralization are known. The best-delineated deposit is the Rosemont, which has a geological ore reserve of around 550 million tons at about 0.45% copper, with significant molybdenum and silver credits.

In 2010, Rosemont was owned by Augusta Resources. Augusta hoped to put the Rosemont into production as early as 2011. The Rosemont Copper plan was to create a 21st-century mine in Southern Arizona. Rosemont's plan set new higher standards for environmental protection by using new technologies for water conservation and tailings storage. In addition Rosemont Copper was expected to produce more than 2,900 jobs annually for the state of Arizona and more than $19 billion in economic activity.

Rosemont Copper's plan was being reviewed by numerous local, state, and federal authorities and would only be issued permits to operate once all environmental protections were in place.

There is significant local opposition [As of 12/23/2015 no mining operations have started] to the construction of the mine, including concerns about the loss of the multiple historic and pre-historic sites that are in the area, cultural resources, and natural habitation.

Gallery

See also

 List of ghost towns in Arizona
 Santa Rita Experimental Range and Wildlife Area
 Larcena Pennington Page

References

External links

 Photos and information at ghosttowns.com
 Helvetia mining district
 Rosemont Copper Co. 
 Helvetia graveyard photo 
 Helvetia history and photos
 "A Clash Over Mining and Water", NY Times article on Rosemont Copper and its opposition, published March 21, 2012.
 Helvetia – Ghost Town of the Month at azghosttowns.com

Former populated places in Pima County, Arizona
Ghost towns in Arizona
Populated places established in 1891
1891 establishments in Arizona Territory
Populated places disestablished in 1921
1921 disestablishments in Arizona
Cemeteries in Arizona